Upper Mustang (formerly Kingdom of Lo) is an upper part (Northern area) of Mustang District, which is located in Nepal. The Upper Mustang was a restricted kingdom until 1992 which makes it one of the most preserved regions in the world, with a majority of the population still speaking traditional Tibetic languages. Tibetan culture has been preserved by the relative isolation of the region from the outside world. Life in Mustang revolves around tourism, animal husbandry, and trade.

The Upper Mustang comprise the northern two-thirds of Mustang District of Gandaki Province, Nepal. It consists of three rural municipalities namely Lo Manthang, Dalome, and Baragung Muktichhetra.

The southern third (lower Mustang) of the district is called Thak and is the homeland of the Thakali, who speak the Thakali language, and whose culture combines Tibetan and Nepalese elements.

Mustang's status as a kingdom ended in 2008 when its suzerain Kingdom of Nepal became a republic. The influence of the outside world, especially China, is growing and contributing to rapid change in the lives of Mustang's people. Development works have increased in recent years.

History 

Mustang was once an independent kingdom, although closely tied by language and culture to Tibet. From the 15th century to the 17th century, its strategic location granted Mustang control over the trade between the Himalayas and India. At the end of the 18th century the kingdom was annexed by Nepal and became a dependency of the Kingdom of Nepal since 1795.

Kingdom of Lo Manthang supported Tibet and the Qing Empire during the Sino-Nepalese War.

Though still recognized by many Mustang residents, the monarchy ceased to exist on October 7, 2008, by order of the Government of Nepal. The last official and later unofficial king (raja or gyelpo) was Jigme Dorje Palbar Bista (1930–2016), who traced his lineage directly back to Ame Pal, the warrior who founded this Buddhist kingdom in 1380. Ame Pal oversaw the founding and building of much of the Lo and Mustang capital of Lo Manthang, a walled city that has changed little in appearance since that time period.

In 2007, a shepherd in Mustang discovered a collection of 55 cave paintings depicting the life of the Buddha.

Climate 
It is in the rain shadow of the Annapurna and Dhaulagiri ranges.

The Day and Night Temperature in Upper Mustang according to the months is shown below:

Demographics 
The population of the whole Mustang District in 2001 was 14,981, spread between three towns and approximately thirty smaller settlements. The inhabitants are either Thakalis, Gurung or, in traditional Mustang, primarily Tibetan.

The tough conditions cause a large winter migration into lower regions of Nepal. The administrative center of Mustang District is at Jomsom ( south of Kagbeni) which has had an airport since 1962 and has become the main tourist entry point since Mustang was opened to western tourism in 1992.

Geography 

The main hydrographic feature of Mustang is the Gandaki River. The river runs southward towards Nepal Terai, bisecting Mustang. Routes paralleling the river once served as a major trade route between Tibet and India, especially for salt. Part of the river valley in the southern Mustang District forms the Kali Gandaki Gorge, by some measures the deepest gorge in the world.

Transport 
Upper Mustang is on an ancient trade route between Nepal and Tibet exploiting the lowest  pass Kora La through the Himalaya west of Sikkim. This route remained in use until China's annexation of Tibet in 1950.

Mechanized access inside Nepal began with the opening of an airstrip at Jomsom at the approximate boundary between the southern Thak and northern Lo sections of the valley, which was in operation by the 1960s.

China eventually decided to revitalize trade and in 2001 completed a  road from the international border to Lo Manthang. Across the TAR border is Zhongba County of Shigatse Prefecture.

Meanwhile, road-building from the south was inhibited by difficulties along the Kali Gandaki Gorge to the south, but proceeded incrementally. In 2010, a  gap remained but the road was completed before 2015 and is suitable for high clearance and four wheel drive vehicles.

Currently, the easiest and only widely used road corridor, from Kathmandu to Lhasa—named Arniko Highway in Nepal and China National Highway 318 in the TAR—traverses a  pass. This is some  higher than Kora La.

Tourism 

Foreign visitors have been allowed to the region since 1992, but tourism to Upper Mustang is regulated. Foreigners need to obtain a special permit to enter, costing US$50 per day per person. Most tourists travel by foot over largely the same trade route used in the 15th century. Over a thousand western trekkers now visit each year, with over 7,000 between (mid-July 2018 to mid-July 2019). August and October are the peak visiting months. On August 27, 2010, local youth leaders in Mustang threatened to bar tourists beginning October 1, 2010 due to the refusal of the Nepalese government to provide any of the $50 per day fee to the local economy. Visitation, however, continued uninterrupted beyond that date.

Mustang is rich in Buddhist culture, similar to the area of the Tibet Autonomous Region of the People's Republic of China. It is an alternate way to experience the Tibetan culture and landscape to the tours provided by the Chinese government. The Tiji festival in Lo-Manthang is another popular destination for tourists in the area seeking to experience the native culture.

The first westerner in Mustang was Toni Hagen, Swiss explorer and geologist, who visited the Kingdom in 1952 during one of his travels across the Himalayas. French Michel Peissel is considered the first westerner to stay in Lo Manthang, during the first authorised exploration of Mustang in 1964.

See also
Jomsom Airport
Mustang Caves
Sonam Lhundrup
Tangbe
Lo Manthang Palace

References

Bibliography
 Michel Peissel (1967). Mustang – A lost Tibetan Kingdom. Dutton, New York.
 Clara Marullo (1995). The Last Forbidden Kingdom, Mustang: Land of Tibetan Buddhism. Photographs by Vanessa Schuurbeque. Charles E. Tuttle Co., Ltd., Rutland, Vermont. .
 Peter Matthiessen (1996). East of Lo Monthang – In the Land of Mustang. Photography by Thomas Laird. Shambhala Publications, Berkeley, Cal.

Documentaries
 Lost Treasures of Tibet, 2003-2-18.
 The Last Lost Kingdom, a Feature Documentary by Larry Levene.

External links
 

Former monarchies of Asia
Former countries in Chinese history
History of Tibet
History of Nepal
Tibetan Buddhist places
Unification of Nepal
Hill stations in Nepal